Stephanie Johnson may refer to:

Stephanie Johnson (Days of Our Lives)
Stephanie Johnson (school shooting victim)
Stephanie Johnson (tennis) (born 1946), also known as Stephanie DeFina
Stephanie Johnson (author) (born 1961), New Zealand author
Stephanie Anne Johnson (born 1952), African-American mixed media artist